TS Class 4 was a series of five trams built by Strømmens Værksted for Trondheim Sporvei. They were delivered in 1930, and numbered 35–39.

They were the first trams to have the wider  bodies, that allowed four-abreast seating. They remained in service until the Dalsenget fire on 10 October 1956, in which four of the trams burnt down. No. 36 survived the fire, but fell victim to another fire not long after. No. 36 was rebuilt by Strømmen with one cab and doors in one side only, and was assigned no. 8. In 1975, it was rebuilt as a maintenance car and salt tram, and was assigned no. 47. It was taken out of service in 1982 and has been preserved at Trondheim Tramway Museum.

References

Trondheim Tramway stock

600 V DC multiple units
Multiple units of Norway